Black Mountain College was a private liberal arts college in Black Mountain, North Carolina. It was founded in 1933 by John Andrew Rice, Theodore Dreier, and several others. The college was ideologically organized around John Dewey's educational philosophy, which emphasized holistic learning and the study of art as central to a liberal arts education. Many of the college's faculty and students were or would go on to become highly influential in the arts, including Josef and Anni Albers, Charles Olson, Ruth Asawa,  Max Dehn, Walter Gropius, Ray Johnson, Robert Motherwell, Dorothea Rockburne, Cy Twombly, Robert Rauschenberg, Susan Weil, Merce Cunningham, John Cage, Buckminster Fuller, Franz Kline, Aaron Siskind, Willem and Elaine de Kooning, and Mary Caroline Richards. Although it was quite notable during its lifetime, the school closed in 1957 after 24 years due to funding issues; Camp Rockmont for Boys now sits on the campus' site. The history and legacy of Black Mountain College are preserved and extended by the Black Mountain College Museum + Arts Center, located in downtown Asheville, North Carolina.

History 
Black Mountain was founded in 1933 by John Andrew Rice, Theodore Dreier, Frederick Georgia, and Ralph Lounsbury, who were dismissed as faculty from Rollins College in a seminal academic freedom incident, specifically for refusing to sign a loyalty pledge, for which Rollins was formally censured by the American Association of University Professors. The institution was established to "avoid the pitfalls of autocratic chancellors and trustees and allow for a more flexible curriculum," and "with the holistic aim 'to educate a student as a person and a citizen.'" The school was originally funded through a $10,000 gift from "Mac" Forbes, a former Rollins College faculty member, after the founders were unable to raise funds from traditional sources.:7

Black Mountain was experimental in nature and committed to an interdisciplinary approach, prioritizing art-making as a necessary component of education and attracting a faculty and lecturers that included many of America's leading visual artists, composers, poets, and designers.  During the 1930s and 1940s the school flourished, becoming well known as an incubator for artistic talent. Notable events at the school were common; it was here that the first large-scale geodesic dome was made by faculty member Buckminster Fuller and students, where Merce Cunningham formed his dance company, and where John Cage staged his first musical happening. In the 1950s, the focus of the school shifted to the literary arts under the rectorship of Charles Olson. Olson founded The Black Mountain Review in 1954 and, together with his colleague and student Robert Creeley, developed the poetic school of Black Mountain poets.

Additionally, the College was an important incubator for the American avant-garde. Black Mountain proved to be an important precursor to and prototype for many of the alternative colleges of today, ranging from College of the Atlantic, Naropa University, the University of California, Santa Cruz, and Marlboro College to The Evergreen State College, Hampshire College, Shimer College, Prescott College, Goddard College, World College West (1973-1992), and New College of Florida, among others, including Warren Wilson College located just minutes down the road from where Black Mountain College was located. Bennington College, based on the same philosophy, was founded one year before Black Mountain College.

Structure 

The school operated using non-hierarchical methodologies that placed students and educators on the same plane. Revolving around 20th-century ideals about the value and importance of balancing education, art, and cooperative labor, students were required to participate in farm work, construction projects, and kitchen duty as part of their holistic education. The students were involved at all levels of institutional decision-making. They were also left in charge of deciding when they were ready to graduate, which notoriously few ever did. There were no course requirements, official grades (except for transfer purposes), or accredited degrees. Graduates were presented with handcrafted diplomas as purely ceremonial symbols of their achievement. The liberal arts program offered at Black Mountain was broad, and supplemented by art making as a means of cultivating creative thinking within all fields. While Josef Albers led the school, the only two requirements were a course on materials and form taught by Albers and a course on Plato.

Sociopolitical context 

In 1933, the Nazis shut down the Bauhaus in Germany, a similarly progressive arts-based educational institution. Many of the school's faculty left Europe for the US, and a number of them settled at Black Mountain, most notably Josef Albers, who was selected to run the art program, and his wife Anni Albers, who taught weaving and textile design.

Adolf Hitler's rise to power and the subsequent persecution taking place in Europe led many artists and intellectuals to flee and resettle in the US, populating Black Mountain College with an influx of both students and faculty.

In addition, the college was operating in the South during the period of legal racial segregation at other colleges and universities in the region. While not immune from racial tensions, the student Alma Stone Williams, an African-American woman who enrolled at Black Mountain College in 1944, is considered by some to be the first black student to enroll in an all-white institution of higher education in the South during the Jim Crow era. Notable African-American instructors included Carol Brice and Roland Hayes during the 1945 Summer Music Institute; Percy H. Baker, hired on full-time in 1945; Jacob Lawrence and Gwendolyn Knight during the 1946 Summer Art Institute; and Mark Oakland Fax for the Spring 1946 quarter. The Julius Rosenwald Fund provided African-American teachers' salaries as well as student scholarships.

Locations 
The college originally rented the YMCA Blue Ridge Assembly buildings south of Black Mountain, North Carolina. In 1937, it purchased a 667-acre property across the valley at Lake Eden.:8 In May 1941, following the end of their lease at Blue Ridge Assembly, the College moved its operations to Lake Eden, where it remained until its closing in 1957.:8 The property was later purchased and converted to an ecumenical Christian boys' residential summer camp (Camp Rockmont). This has been used for years as the site of the Black Mountain Festival, the Lake Eden Arts Festival, and Black Mountain College Museum + Arts Center's {Re}HAPPENING. A number of the original structures are still in use as lodgings or administrative facilities, and two frescos painted by Jean Charlot remain intact on the site.

Closing 
Black Mountain College closed in 1957, eight years after Albers left to direct the first design department at Yale. The college suspended classes by court order due to debts; the school was unable to sustain itself financially given the greatly decreased number of students. In 1962, the school's books were finally closed, with all debts covered.

Legacy 
The Black Mountain College Museum & Arts Center, founded in 1993, continues the legacy of Black Mountain College through talks, exhibitions, performances, collection and preservation, and an annual fall conference that examines the college's history and impact. The Journal of Black Mountain College Studies is a peer-reviewed, open-access digital publication that publishes articles, essays, and creative work related to the school and the individuals associated with it.

Black Mountain College was the subject of the museum exhibition Leap Before You Look: Black Mountain College 1933-1957, which opened at the Institute of Contemporary Art, Boston on October 10, 2015. The show was curated by Helen Molesworth with Ruth Erickson. The show later exhibited at the Hammer Museum from February 21 to May 15, 2016.

Black Mountain College was featured in Nicholas Sparks' novel, The Longest Ride (2013) and the 2015 movie adaptation of the same name.

See also 
Category: Black Mountain College faculty
Category: Black Mountain College alumni
Antioch College
Bennington College
Cooper Union
 Milton Avery Graduate School of the Arts
 The Evergreen State College
 Warren Wilson College
 Rochdale College
 Hampshire College
 Goddard College
 Marlboro College
College of the Atlantic
 Cornish College of the Arts
 New College of Florida
 Prescott College

References

Bibliography

 
 
 
 
 
 
 
 
 
 
 
 
  (exhibit review)

External links 
 Official website
 'Black Mountain:A Thumbnail Sketch' (Youtube; documentary by South Carolina ETV, 14m)

 
University and college buildings on the National Register of Historic Places in North Carolina
International style architecture in North Carolina
Art schools in North Carolina
Black Mountain College alumni
Education in Buncombe County, North Carolina
Defunct private universities and colleges in North Carolina
Modernism
Music schools in North Carolina
Liberal arts colleges in North Carolina
Educational institutions established in 1933
Buildings and structures in Buncombe County, North Carolina
1933 establishments in North Carolina
1957 disestablishments in North Carolina
National Register of Historic Places in Buncombe County, North Carolina
Historic districts on the National Register of Historic Places in North Carolina
Academic freedom
Educational institutions disestablished in 1957
Rollins College